The  is a tramcar type operated by Tokyo Metropolitan Bureau of Transportation (Toei) on the Toden Arakawa Line in Tokyo, Japan, since 1990.

Operations
The fleet is based at Arakawa Depot, and operates on the sole remaining tram line in Tokyo, the Toden Arakawa Line.

History
The five cars in the fleet were built between 1990 and 1993 by Alna Sharyo. The individual car build histories are as follows.

References

External links

 Toden rolling stock 

Electric multiple units of Japan
Tokyo Metropolitan Bureau of Transportation
Train-related introductions in 1990
600 V DC multiple units